is a Japanese former footballer who last plays for Tokushima Vortis until 2022. In 2007, he was picked to join the U-20 Japan squad to compete 2007 FIFA U-20 World Cup in Canada.

Club career
Fujita joined Consadole Sapporo youth academy at age 15. He was a member of Consadole's youth team that reached the final of the Prince Takamado Cup in 2005, Consadole lost 4–1 to Tokyo Verdy. He turned professional in December 2005. He made his first-team debut on 3 December 2005 in a J2 League match against Thespa Kusatsu.

On 23 December 2010, Fujita signed for Albirex Niigata for a fee believed to be around ¥50million. He made his debut on 5 March 2011 against Avispa Fukuoka.

On 7 January 2023, Tokushima Vortis announced his retirement.  After his retirement, he will become an academy staff member of Hokkaido Consadole Sapporo.

National team career
In July 2007, Fujita was elected Japan U-20 national team for 2007 U-20 World Cup. At this tournament, he played all 4 matches as right midfielder.

Career statistics

Club
Updated to the end of 2022 season.

National team

References

External links

Profile at Shonan Bellmare

1987 births
Living people
Association football people from Hokkaido
Japanese footballers
Japan youth international footballers
J1 League players
J2 League players
Hokkaido Consadole Sapporo players
Albirex Niigata players
Shonan Bellmare players
Tokushima Vortis players
Association football midfielders
Sportspeople from Sapporo